Ericusa fulgetrum, the lightning volute, is a species of sea snail, a marine gastropod mollusk in the family Volutidae, the volutes.

Etymology
The species Latin name fulgetrum means "lightning" (hence the common name).

Description
It is solid and fusiform. The colour pattern is quite variable, the base colour may be yellowish, pale brown or reddish. It has a glossy marbled surface, sometimes with dark brown zig-zag bands. The whorls are regular and convex. Protoconch is smooth and rounded and the aperture is elongate, with a thickened outer lip. This nocturnal snail predates on small invertebrates.

Distribution
This species can be found in South Australia.

References

External links
Encyclopaedia of Life

Volutidae
Gastropods described in 1825